HK Lida (Belar. ХК Лида) is a Belarusian ice hockey team that plays in the Belarusian Extraleague. They play their home games at the Sport Palace Lida, in Lida.

History
HK Lida were founded in 2011 and joined the Belarusian Extraleague for the start of the 2011–12 season. The team base themselves at the Sport Palace Lida; built in 2010, the building has a capacity of 1,000. HK Lida finished the 2011–12 season in sixth place, advancing to the playoffs. In the quarterfinals they lost the best of five game series to HK Gomel 0–3. In 2011 HK Lida also competed in their first Belarusian Cup. Placed in Group II Lida finished in fourth place and failed to progress to the final. At the 2012 Belarusian Cup Lida again finished fourth in Group II and failed to advance.

Season by season results

Belarusian Extraleague

Belarusian Cup

Roster
''Team roster for the 2012–13 Belarusian Extraliga season

References

External links
Official website

Ice hockey teams in Belarus
Belarusian Extraleague teams
2011 establishments in Belarus
Ice hockey clubs established in 2011